Pitharatus is a genus of Southeast Asian orb-weaver spiders containing the single species, Pitharatus junghuhni. It was first described by Eugène Simon in 1895 to contain the single species moved from the now obsolete "catch-all" genus Epeira. It has  only been found in Malaysia and Indonesia.

References

Araneidae
Monotypic Araneomorphae genera
Spiders of Asia
Taxa named by Eugène Simon